The 2020–21 St. Lawrence Saints Men's ice hockey season was the 81st season of play for the program and the 60th season in the ECAC Hockey conference. The Saints represented the St. Lawrence University and were coached by Brent Brekke, in his 2nd season.

Season
As a result of the ongoing COVID-19 pandemic the entire college ice hockey season was delayed. Because the NCAA had previously announced that all winter sports athletes would retain whatever eligibility they possessed through at least the following year, none of St. Lawrence's players would lose a season of play. However, the NCAA also approved a change in its transfer regulations that would allow players to transfer and play immediately rather than having to sit out a season, as the rules previously required.

After an abysmal season, St. Lawrence continued to see a great deal of roster turnover as the program recovered from Mark Morris's tenure. The Saints got a late start to the season, even after the delay due to COVID, but the team played surprisingly well once they got on the ice. buoyed by the play of junior netminder Emil Zetterquist, SLU gave opponents fits throughout the season, holding at least a .500 record until February when the team ran into league-leading Quinnipiac and lost four consecutive matches against the Bobcats. Even with the losses, however, St. Lawrence kept the score close and demonstrated great strides by a team that had finished last in the ECAC for three consecutive years.

St. Lawrence's final matchup of the regular season was cancelled when Clarkson ended their season due to COVID protocol violations. The Saints ended in 3rd place, giving them a home game for the ECAC Tournament. Ordinarily this would have been seen as a positive for the team, but St. Lawrence hadn't won a single home game through 7 games. Despite the recent history, SLU produced its largest offensive output of the season and defeated Colgate 5–4 in overtime. The Saints found themselves playing for a chance to go to the NCAA Tournament despite a 5–8–3 record and got out to an early lead. Quinnipiac took over in the second and then tried to play in a defensive shell for the remainder of the contest but the Larries scored late and then David Jankowski scored the game-winner in the fourth minute of overtime.

The miraculous, albeit short, run for the Saints gave them their first league championship in 20 years and their first tournament berth since 2007. Unfortunately, everything came crashing to a halt a day later when Brent Brekke tested positive for COVID-19 and St. Lawrence was forced to withdraw from the tournament. St. Lawrence was just the second ECAC Tournament champion to not play in the NCAA Tournament and the second time a team declined an automatic invitation to a national tournament, the previous time for both was by Harvard in 1963.

Grant Adams and Luke Erickson sat out the season.

Departures

Recruiting

Roster
As of December 31, 2020.

Standings

Schedule and results

|-
!colspan=12 style=";" | Regular Season

|-
!colspan=12 style=";" | 

|-
!colspan=12 style=";" | 
|- align="center" bgcolor="#e0e0e0"
|colspan=12|St. Lawrence Withdrew due to COVID-19 positive

Scoring statistics

Goaltending statistics

Rankings

USCHO did not release a poll in week 20.

Awards and honors

References

St. Lawrence Saints men's ice hockey seasons
St. Lawrence Saints
St. Lawrence Saints
St. Lawrence Saints
2021 in sports in New York (state)
2020 in sports in New York (state)